Doc Dougherty may refer to:

 Brian Dougherty (born 1973), American lacrosse goaltender
 Ed Dougherty (born 1947), American professional golfer 
 Johnny Dougherty, Philadelphia labor leader

See also
 Doc Daugherty, Harold Ray Daugherty (1927–2015), American baseball player and manager, and high school football coach